Ingeborg Marx (born  in Hasselt) is a Belgian female retired weightlifter, competing in the 58 kg category and representing Belgium at international competitions. 

She participated at the 2000 Summer Olympics in the 58 kg event. She competed at world championships, most recently at the 1999 World Weightlifting Championships.

Major results

References

External links
 
 http://www.alamy.com/stock-photo-ingeborg-marx-from-belgium-58-kg-category-tries-to-lift-1125-kg-in-118668551.html
 http://www.todor66.com/olim/2000/Weightlifting/Women_under_58kg.html
 http://archive.powerlifting.org/idec98.htm

1970 births
Living people
Belgian female weightlifters
Weightlifters at the 2000 Summer Olympics
Olympic weightlifters of Belgium
Sportspeople from Hasselt
20th-century Belgian women
21st-century Belgian women